Cushman Dam No. 2 is a hydroelectric dam on the North Fork of the Skokomish River in Mason County, Washington, United States, forming Lake Kokanee. Built in 1930, its three 27,000 kilowatt generators provide 233 million kilowatt-hours annually to the Tacoma Power system. Along with Cushman Dam No. 1, it is part of Tacoma Power's Cushman Project.

Construction began in 1929 and power production began in December 1930. It is 235 feet tall.

See also

Cushman Dam No. 1
National Register of Historic Places listings in Mason County, Washington

References

External links
Historic American Engineering Record (HAER) documentation, filed under North Fork Skokomish River, Hoodsport, Mason County, WA:

Dams in Washington (state)
Historic American Engineering Record in Washington (state)
Hydroelectric power plants in Washington (state)
Buildings and structures in Mason County, Washington
United States power company dams
Dams completed in 1930
Dams on the National Register of Historic Places in Washington (state)
National Register of Historic Places in Mason County, Washington
Energy infrastructure completed in 1930
Neoclassical architecture in Washington (state)
Historic districts on the National Register of Historic Places in Washington (state)
Tacoma Public Utilities